Barry Crane (born Barry Cohen; November 10, 1927 – July 5, 1985) was a prolific television producer and director, and a bridge player who "won more titles than anyone else in the history of the game". According to the American Contract Bridge League (ACBL), he was "widely recognized as the top  player of all time" —the tournament format commonly played in private clubs. In 1985 Crane was murdered, a crime that was not solved until 2021.

Early life
Barry Cohen was born 1927 in Detroit, Michigan, and was later sometimes credited under his birth name. In the mid-1950s he moved to Hollywood and changed his name for professional reasons. He produced The Magician, and was an associate producer on several episodes of Mission: Impossible. He was credited with directing numerous episodes of such series as Trapper John, M.D., The Incredible Hulk, Hawaii Five-O, CHiPs, Dallas, Wonder Woman, Mission: Impossible, and Mannix.

Bridge competition
Crane, who won 15 North American championships, was a Grand Life Master in the ACBL and traveled extensively to play in matchpoint pairs tournaments. In World Bridge Federation (WBF) competition he and Kerri Shuman won the fourth quadrennial World Mixed Pairs Championship in 1978. In North America he also played in  tournaments (where the strategy is subtly different from matchpoint play) and won numerous regional titles. His teams reached the Vanderbilt final in 1951 and 1985, his first and last high finishes in North America-level events.

During his lifetime, Crane accumulated 35,135.80 masterpoints (awarded by the ACBL for success in tournament play), more than any other player. Second-placed Paul Soloway was approximately 11,000 behind at Crane's death in 1985 and passed him only in 1991. In honor and as a memorial to Crane, the ACBL renamed the award given to the player who accumulates the most masterpoints in a single year to the Barry Crane Trophy, and the list of high masterpoint attainers to the Barry Crane Top 500. Crane was elected to the ACBL Hall of Fame in 1995.

Murder 

Crane was murdered on July 5, 1985, a homicide that went unsolved for 34 years. His body was "found bludgeoned shortly before 3 P.M. in the garage of his luxury town home in Studio City", apparently dragged to the garage from his apartment, according to the police. That week he was playing daily in the annual Pasadena regional knockout teams tournament; his team won the Saturday final with Kerri Shuman, one of Crane's favorite partners, as his replacement.

The Integrated Automated Fingerprint Identification System led to a suspect in Crane's murder being taken into custody on May 9, 2019, based on fingerprint and DNA evidence linking him to the crime; additionally, according to a statement from the Los Angeles Police Department, the suspect confessed to murdering Crane during an interview with LAPD detectives on March 8, 2019.

Edwin Jerry Hiatt pled guilty on October 7, 2021 to voluntary manslaughter of Crane. Hiatt was sentenced to 12 years in state prison.

Bridge accomplishments

Honors
 ACBL Hall of Fame, 1995

Awards
 McKenney Trophy 1952, 1967, 1971, 1973, 1975, 1978
 Mott-Smith Trophy 1970, 1971
 Oeschger Trophy 1961, 1962, 1963, 1967
 Stoddard Memorial Trophy 1980
 IBPA Award (Personality of the Year) 1985

Wins
 World Mixed Pairs (1) 1978
 North American Bridge Championships (15)
 North American Swiss Teams (1) 1978
 North American Men's Swiss Teams (1) 1983
 Master Mixed Teams (1) 1980
 West Coast Master Mixed Teams (2) 1953, 1954
 Open Pairs (7) 1964, 1970, 1971, 1972, 1974, 1977, 1983
 Men's Pairs (1) 1966
 Rockwell Mixed Pairs (2) 1975, 1982

Runners-up
 North American Bridge Championships (11)
 Vanderbilt (2) 1951, 1985
 Men's Board-a-Match Teams (2) 1956, 1971
 Master Mixed Teams (1) 1969
 Open Pairs (2) 1976, 1984
 Rockwell Mixed Pairs (3) 1971, 1974, 1977
 Hilliard Mixed Pairs (1) 1955

References

External links

 
 
 

1927 births
1985 deaths
American contract bridge players
American television directors
Television producers from California
Male murder victims
American murder victims
Businesspeople from Detroit
People murdered in California
20th-century American businesspeople
People from Studio City, Los Angeles
University of Michigan alumni
1985 murders in the United States